Garey Lamar Ingram (born July 25, 1970 in Columbus, Georgia) is a former Major League Baseball infielder and outfielder.

Career
Drafted by the Los Angeles Dodgers in the 44th round of the 1989 MLB amateur draft out of Middle Georgia College, Ingram spent many years in the Dodgers minor league system. He made his professional debut with the Bakersfield Dodgers in 1991, hitting .297 with 30 stolen bases during the 1991 season. From 1992 through 1994 he played with the Dodgers Double-A franchise in San Antonio.

Ingram made his Major League Baseball debut with the Los Angeles Dodgers on May 15, 1994 as a defensive replacement against the San Diego Padres. His first career hit was a home run against Colorado Rockies pitcher Mike Munoz on May 19. He appeared in 26 games for the Dodgers that season, hitting .282 with 3 home runs and 8 RBIs.

He split the 1995 season between the Dodgers and AAA Albuquerque.  Ingram missed most of the 1996 season due to an injury and then spent 1997 with San Antonio and 1998 with Albuquerque before being picked up by the Boston Red Sox as a minor league free agent in 1999. Spent two seasons with the Pawtucket Red Sox before he was released. Played independent ball in 2001 and then spent 2002 with the Dodgers new AAA team, the Las Vegas 51s before retiring from baseball.

After his retirement, he became a hitting coach in the Dodgers farm system. First with the GCL Dodgers in 2002 and then with the South Georgia Waves and Columbus Catfish from 2003 to 2006. In 2007 and 2008 he was the hitting coach for the Great Lakes Loons in Single-A.  During the 2009 season, he was the hitting coach for the Connecticut Defenders.  After the completion of the season, Ingram was hired by the Atlanta Braves to serve in the same position for their AA Mississippi Braves.

Post-Baseball Hobbies
As an avid crappie fisherman, Garey recently started a new adventure in North Carolina filming his fishing outings on numerous city lakes across the state. Join Garey at Cove Ultimate Fishing (on YouTube) and his fishing adventures by subscribing and sharing his content.

External links

1970 births
Living people
African-American baseball players
Albuquerque Dukes players
American expatriate baseball players in Mexico
Bakersfield Dodgers players
Baseball players from Columbus, Georgia
Broncos de Reynosa players
Elmira Pioneers players
Great Falls Dodgers players
Las Vegas 51s players
Los Angeles Dodgers players
Major League Baseball second basemen
Major League Baseball third basemen
Middle Georgia Warriors baseball players
Mexican League baseball left fielders
Mexican League baseball center fielders
Pawtucket Red Sox players
San Antonio Missions players
21st-century African-American sportspeople
20th-century African-American sportspeople